The list of ABA League-winning coaches shows all head coaches who won the Adriatic League, the Adriatic Basketball Association-run regional men's professional basketball league that features clubs from former Yugoslavia (Bosnia and Herzegovina, Croatia, Montenegro, North Macedonia, Serbia, and Slovenia) along with an occasional club outside of that territory.

List of winners

Multiple winners

See also 
 List of Serbian League-winning coaches

References

External links
 
 Adriatic League page at Eurobasket.com

 
Basketball in Serbia lists